Sapunovo is a rural locality (a village) in Kupriyanovskoye Rural Settlement, Gorokhovetsky District, Vladimir Oblast, Russia. The population was 16 as of 2010.

Geography 
Sapunovo is located 14 km south of Gorokhovets (the district's administrative centre) by road. Pogost is the nearest rural locality.

References 

Rural localities in Gorokhovetsky District